John M. Coyne Sr. (November 11, 1916 – July 21, 2014) was the mayor of Brooklyn, Ohio from 1948 to 1999. Coyne held the record for the longest consecutive term of any mayor in United States at the time he left office. Coyne continued to reside in the city.  He was reportedly responsible for the country's first seat belt (in 1966) and mobile phone laws for motorists, bringing notoriety to Brooklyn. In Brooklyn, police stopped 150 cars the first six months of the ordinance, letting drivers off with warnings. After that, minimal fines were imposed, with Coyne quoted as saying, "...because the worst thing you can do is give the impression that you're socking them for taxation."

Coyne died in Brooklyn, Ohio from natural causes, aged 97.

Awards and Distinctions
His awards include:

Other Achievements
Coyne pioneered legislation positioning Brooklyn, Ohio as the vanguard of public safety initiatives: the 1998 cell phone law restricted use of hand-held cell phones while driving.  His 1989 Assault Weapons Ban and Mandatory Waiting Period laws prohibited the possession of certain assault weapons and mandated a ten-day waiting period for gun sale transactions.

Legacy
Coyne has a recreation center in his name, the "John M. Coyne Recreation Center," located in Brooklyn, Ohio.

References

1916 births
2014 deaths
Mayors of places in Ohio
People from Brooklyn, Ohio
Ohio Democrats